The 2014–15 Boston College Eagles men's basketball team represented Boston College during the 2014–15 NCAA Division I men's basketball season. The Eagles, led by first year head coach Jim Christian, played their home games at Conte Forum and were members of the Atlantic Coast Conference. They finished the season 13–19, 4–14 in ACC play to finish in 13th place. They advanced to the second round of the ACC tournament where they lost to North Carolina.

Last season
The Eagles finished the season 8–24, 4–14 in ACC play to finish in 14th place. They lost in the first round of the ACC tournament to Georgia Tech.

Departures

Incoming Transfers

Recruiting

Roster

Schedule and results 

|-
!colspan=9 style="background:#790024; color:#C5B358;"| Exhibition

|-
!colspan=9 style="background:#790024; color:#C5B358;"| Regular season

|-
!colspan=9 style="background:#790024; color:#C5B358;"| ACC tournament

See also
2014–15 Boston College Eagles women's basketball team

Boston College Eagles men's basketball seasons
Boston College
Boston College Eagles men's basketball
Boston College Eagles men's basketball
Boston College Eagles men's basketball
Boston College Eagles men's basketball